High school football rivalries in the United States less than 100 years old include:

See also
List of high school football rivalries more than 100 years old

References

High school
Rivalries